Pat Patterson may refer to:

Sports
 Pat Patterson (American football) (1889–1987), at Georgia Tech
 Pat Patterson (infielder, born 1897) (1897–1977), for the New York Giants
 Pat Patterson (infielder, born 1911) (1911–1984), American Negro league infielder
 Pat Patterson (coach) (1934–2007), Louisiana Tech University coach
 Pat Patterson (wrestler) (1941–2020), Canadian-American wrestler
 Pat Patterson (footballer) (born 1946), Australian rules footballer
 Patrick Patterson (cricketer) (born 1961), cricketer
 Patrick Patterson (basketball) (born 1989), American professional basketball player

Other
 Clair Cameron Patterson (1922–1995), geochemist, a.k.a. Pat
 Pat Patterson (politician) (born 1948), Florida politician

See also
 Pat Paterson (1910–1978), actress
 Patrick Patterson (disambiguation)
 Patterson (surname)